Chen Juewan (5 April 1932 – 7 October 2022) was a Chinese educator and politician who served as president of Huaqiao University from 1988 to 1993. He was a delegate to the 7th National People's Congress and a member of the 8th National Committee of the Chinese People's Political Consultative Conference.

Biography
Chen was born in Surabaya, Java, Dutch East Indies (now Indonesia), on 5 April 1932, to Chen Mingjin, a Chinese educator who mainly worked in Surabaya, and Lin Shuyun, a Chinese teacher. His ancestral home is in Anxi County, Fujian. He returned to China in 1948 and attended Anxi County High School, and soon was admitted to Haijiang College two years later. In 1950, he entered Jilin University, and worked there after graduation, where he was promoted to associate professor in 1979 and to full professor in 1985. He joined the Chinese Communist Party in July 1982. He was named a vice-president of Huaqiao University in October 1985. He moved up the ranks to become executive vice president in September 1986 and president in August 1988. He retired in January 1998.

On 7 October 2022, he died from an illness in Quanzhou, Fujian, at the age of 90.

References

1932 births
2022 deaths
People from Surabaya
Jilin University alumni
Academic staff of Jilin University
Chinese educators
People's Republic of China politicians from Fujian
Chinese Communist Party politicians from Fujian
Delegates to the 7th National People's Congress
Members of the 8th Chinese People's Political Consultative Conference